The women's artistic team competition at the 2017 Southeast Asian Games was held on 21 August 2017 at the Hall 10, Level 3, Malaysian International Trade & Exhibition Centre (MITEC) in Kuala Lumpur, Malaysia.

The team competition also served as qualification for the event finals.

Schedule
All times are Malaysia Standard Time (UTC+8).

Results

Qualification results

Vault

Uneven bars

Balance beam

Floor exercise

References

External links
 

Women's artistic team